Majdal Bani Fadil is a Palestinian town in the Nablus Governorate of the State of Palestine in the northern West Bank, located  southeast of Nablus. According to the Palestinian Central Bureau of Statistics (PCBS), the town had a population of 2,382 inhabitants in 2007.

Majdal Bani Fadil is under the local administration of a nine-member village council headed by Walid Othman. Most of the village's residents are from the Othman and Zayn ad-Din clans. The main economic activities are herding and agriculture, specifically olives, grapes, prunes and figs. The main road connecting Majdal Bani Fadil to Ramallah and Nablus and Jericho has been closed off to the village since 2000 during the Second Intifada.

Location
Majdal Bani Fadil  is located east  of Qusra, north  of Duma, west of Al-Jiftlik and south of Jurish.

History
Sherds from   Iron Age II,  Hellenistic/Roman, Byzantine,  Crusader/Ayyubid  and  Mamluk eras have been found here.

Ottoman era
In 1517,  the village was included in the Ottoman empire with the rest of Palestine, and potsherds from the  early Ottoman period  have been found here. The population was 18 households, all Muslim. They paid a  fixed  tax rate of 33,3% on agricultural products, such as  wheat, barley, summer crops, olive trees, goats and beehives, in addition to occasional revenues and a fixed tax for people of Nablus area; a total of 1,450  akçe.

In 1838 Edward Robinson noted  Mejdel Beni Fadil   located in El-Beitawy district, east of Nablus, while in 1852 C.W.M. van de Velde noted "large old hewn stones prove sufficiently that here was once an ancient site". The inhabitants had a few tobacco−gardens and olive−trees, and the view of the Ghor from the village  was "truly magnificent", according to  van de Velde.

In 1870 Guérin noted: "I found here two small and ancient columns. Numerous cisterns, caverns, and rock-cut  tombs prove the antiquity of the site, the ancient name of which was doubtless Migdal. I also examined a very curious excavation here, called el Kaf. It is of square form, and measures 26 feet 2 inches on each side. It is three-quarters fallen in, and offers this peculiarity-that those portions of wall still visible are provided on the inside with small niches, some triangular and some vaulted, cut at equal distances and in rows." He further remarked that in the little mosque called Nabi Yahia, there were  two antique reused columns.

In 1882, the PEF's Survey of Western Palestine (SWP) described  it as "a small village on the top of a hill, with olives on the south and west, and a small sacred place on the south-east. On the east are caves, and there are tombs and rock-cut cisterns near the village."

British Mandate era
In the  1922 census of Palestine conducted by the British Mandate authorities, Majdal had a population of  199 Muslims, increasing in the 1931 census  to 310, still all Muslims, in a total of 70  houses.

In  the 1945 statistics  Majdal Bani Fadil had a population of 430  Muslims  and a total of  28,022  dunams of land, according to an official land and population survey. Of this, 1,131 dunams were plantations and irrigable land, 6,994 used for cereals, while 36 dunams were built-up land.

Jordanian era
In the wake of the 1948 Arab–Israeli War, and after the 1949 Armistice Agreements,  Majdal Bani Fadil came under Jordanian rule.

The Jordanian census of 1961 found 628 inhabitants in Majdal Bani Fadil.

Post-1967
After the Six-Day War in 1967,  Majdal Bani Fadil  has been under Israeli occupation. The population of Majdal Bani Fadil in the 1967 census conducted by  Israel was 629, of whom 1  originated from the Israeli territory.

After the 1995 accords, 18% of village land is classified as Area B  (partial Palestinian control), while the remaining 82% is  Area C (full Israeli control)

References

Bibliography

External links
  Welcome To Majdal Bani Fadil
Majdal Bani Fadil, Welcome to Palestine
Survey of Western Palestine, Map 15:    IAA, Wikimedia commons 
  Majdal Bani Fadil Village Profile, Applied Research Institute–Jerusalem, ARIJ
 Majdal Bani Fadil, aerial photo, ARIJ
 Development Priorities and Needs in Majdal Bani Fadil, ARIJ

Nablus Governorate
Villages in the West Bank
Municipalities of the State of Palestine